Aromadendron may refer to :
 Aromadendron Andrews ex Steud., a synonym for Eucalyptus
 Aromadendron Blume, a subsection of the genus Magnolia